The Sepah Street (Persian: خیابان سپه), Also known as the Shohada Street (Persian: خیابان شهدا) is a street in Qazvin, Iran. It is the oldest planned street in Iran, built when Qazvin was the capital of Iran's Safavid empire.

The street leads to the Safavid royal complex in Qazvin, and passes next to the Jameh Mosque of Qazvin and Imamzadeh Hossein.

Name 
During the Qajar era the street was known as "Dowlati". The name Sepah was given to the street during the rule of Reza Shah Pahlavi. In the Persian language "Sepah" means "army". After the Iranian revolution in 1979, the street was renamed to Shohada street, Shohada meaning "Martyrs", to commemorate the dead Iranian soldiers in the Iran Iraq war, and to remove the association the previous name had to the Pahlavi dynasty.

History 

Shah Tahmasp Safavid moved the capital from Tabriz to Qazvin in 1546, as Tabriz was vulnerable to Ottoman attacks. During this time many palaces and gardens were created, as was as the building of Imamzadeh Hossein, and the street was created to connect these places. It is the oldest planned street in Iran.

Gallery

References 

Streets in Iran
Qazvin